The Missouri State Bears men's soccer team represent Missouri State University in NCAA Division I men's soccer. They compete in the Missouri Valley Conference. The team plays its home matches at Betty & Bobby Allison South Stadium. They are currently coached by Jon Leamy who is entering his 29th season as head coach. Missouri State has made 4 NCAA Tournament appearances, most recently in 2019. Their overall record in the NCAA Tournament is 1–4. They have won 8 conference regular season titles and one conference tournament. Missouri State has had 8 players selected in the MLS Draft.

History

Conference memberships
For the first seven years of the programs existence they were an independent. They switched their conference affiliation for a year in 1989 to the Association of Mid-Continent Universities (Summit League).  They switched back to being an independent for the 1990 season. Since 1991 the team has been a member of the Missouri Valley Conference. Prior to 2005, Missouri State was known as Southwest Missouri State. 
1981-1988: Independent 
1989: Association of Mid-Continent Universities† 
1990: Independent 
1991–present: Missouri Valley Conference†
†Founding member of the conference

Roster

Facilities
Betty and Bobby Allison South Stadium

Missouri State plays their home matches at Betty and Bobby Allison South Stadium. The on-campus, 1,500-seat stadium was built in the summer of 2014. The stadium has a combination of bleacher and chair-back seating. The stadium features a Sport Turf artificial turf playing surface. The stadium has locker rooms for both men's and women's soccer programs. It also has a press box and Daktronics LED premier video board.

Championships

Conference championships

Regular season
Missouri State has won 9 regular season conference championships in the team's history. They won back-to-back championships twice, in 2013–2014 and 2019–2020. In 2019 the Bears finished the regular season undefeated in both conference and non-conference play. Jon Leamy has coached the team to all of their championships.

NCAA tournament history
Missouri State has appeared in 4 NCAA Tournaments and has an overall record of 1–4. Missouri State won their first tournament game 2019 at home against Denver 1–0. This was the first time the program hosted a tournament game. Prior to 2005 Missouri State was known as Southwest Missouri State where they made 2 appearances in 1997 and 1999.  Jon Leamy has coached the Bears in all of their tournament appearances.

Yearly results
Missouri State's first season was in 1981 where they went 4-6-1 under head coach Frank Dinka. From the inaugural season in 1981 to the end of the 2004 season Missouri State was known as Southwest Missouri State. The school changed their name to Missouri State in 2005 and since then has been known as Missouri State. The Bears were an independent until 1988 when they joined what is now the Summit League for a year. After a lone season as an independent again, Missouri State joined the Missouri Valley Conference. They have been a member of the MVC ever since. They made their first NCAA Tournament appearance in 1997 when they lost to Saint Louis University in the first round 2–1. The Bears have appeared 3 more times since then, most recently in 2019 where they reached the round of 32. 2019 was also Missouri State's most successful season as they went 18-1-1 and went an undefeated 10-0-0 in conference play and 16-0-0 during the regular season.

MLS Draft History
Missouri State has had several alumni drafted by Major League Soccer clubs in the various MLS drafts.

MLS College Draft
Missouri State has had 1 player drafted in the MLS College Draft. Matt Caution was drafted in the third round of the 1998 Draft by the Dallas Burn. 

Note: The MLS College Draft was held from 1996 to 1999.

MLS Supplemental Draft
Missouri State has had 2 players drafted in the MLS Supplemental Draft. Doug Lascody was drafted in the third round of the 2005 Draft by the Kansas City Wizards. Justin Douglass was drafted in the fourth round of the 2007 Draft by the Houston Dynamo. 

Note: The MLS Supplemental Draft has been held off and on since 1996. The last draft to have taken place was in 2013.

MLS SuperDraft
Missouri State has had 4 players drafted in the MLS SuperDraft. Chris Brunt was drafted in the third round of the 2002 draft by the Kansas City Wizards. Missouri State had two players selected in the 2004 Draft;Matt Pickens in the second round with the Chicago Fire and Jamal Sutton in the fourth round with the Columbus Crew. Matthew Bentley was selected in the fourth round of the 2020 draft by Minnesota United F.C.

References

External links

 
Missouri Valley Conference men's soccer